Ernst Snapper (December 2, 1913, Groningen – February 5, 2011, Chapel Hill, North Carolina) was a Dutch-American mathematician, known for his research in "commutative algebra, algebraic geometry, cohomology of groups, character theory, and combinatorics."

Biography
Ernst Snapper, born to a Jewish family in the Netherlands, received in 1936 the equivalent of a master's degree from the University of Amsterdam. In 1938 his father, Isidore Snapper, an internationally known physician and medical researcher, accepted an offer to become the director of medical research at the Rockefeller Foundation's Peking Union Medical College. Acting on a suggestion from Abraham Flexner, Isidore Snapper encouraged Ernst Snapper to apply to Princeton University to become a graduate student. As a doctoral student of Joseph Wedderburn, Ernst Spanner graduated with a Ph.D. from Princeton University in 1941. In China, his father and mother were interned by the Japanese, but were later released in an exchange. Ernst Snapper was an instructor from 1941 ti 1945 at Princeton University. He was a professor of mathematics from 1945 to 1955 at the University of Southern California, from 1955 to 1958 at Miami University of Ohio, from 1958 to 1963 at Indiana University, and from 1963 to 1979 at Dartmouth College, where he retired as professor emeritus. He was a visiting professor for the academic years 1949–1950 and 1954–1955 at Princeton University and for the academic year 1953–1954 at Harvard University.

His doctoral students include Arunas Rudvalis. Snapper's paper The Three Crises in Mathematics: Logicism, Intuitionism and formalism won the 1980 Carl B. Allendoerfer Award.

He was married to Ethel K. Snapper (1917–1995) for nearly 60 years. Upon his death he was survived by his two sons, John and James, both of whom were graduates of Princeton University, and two granddaughters. John Snapper received his Ph.D. in philosophy from the University of Chicago and became a professor at Illinois Institute of Technology. James Robert Snapper received his M.D. from Harvard Medical School in 1974 and became a pulmonologist and consulting professor in the department of medicine of Duke University School of Medicine.

Ernst Snapper corresponded with Leo Vroman, who was his cousin.

Selected publications

Articles

Books
 
  (reprint of 1971 original)

References

1913 births
2011 deaths
Dutch mathematicians
American mathematicians
American people of Dutch-Jewish descent
Jews who emigrated to escape Nazism
University of Amsterdam alumni
Princeton University alumni
University of Southern California faculty
Miami University faculty
Indiana University faculty
Dartmouth College faculty